Redtail Telematics is a provider of GPS enabled fleet tracking products. The company is based in North America with headquarters in the United Kingdom. Redtail's products use a technology solution known as VAM (Vehicle Asset Management) which includes features such as 
GPS jamming/tamper protection alerts
Motion sensors
Vehicle status engine detection
Onboard diagnostics.

The company's technology is provided by Plextek Limited, with which it has a strategic design partnership.

As of 2015, it has partnered with insurance provider Admiral.

References

Global Positioning System
Road transport
Technology companies of the United Kingdom
Tracking
Vehicle technology